The Network of Executive Women (NEW) is a women's leadership organization serving the retail, consumer goods, financial services and technology industries. It represents more than 13,000 members from 900 companies, 100 corporate partners and 22 regions in the U.S. and Canada.

Leadership 
Sarah Alter was named president and CEO of NEW in June 2017.  She was previously a vice president of Discover Financial Services and Quill.com. 

Other NEW leaders include: Board Chair Monica Turner of Procter & Gamble; Vice Chair Abbe Luersman of Ahold Delhaize, Immediate Past Chair Lisa Walsh, Atlantic Street Capital Advisors, LLC; Treasurer Dagmar Boggs of Coca-Cola; and Secretary Elizabeth Marrion of Accenture.

Research and insights 
NEW conducts independent research and partners with other organizations to help companies achieve gender equality and inclusion. NEW released "The Female Leadership Crisis:  Why Women Are Leaving (and What We Can Do About It)" in February 2018 with Mercer & Co and Accenture.

Regional groups 
The Network of Executive Women has 22 regional groups in the United States and Canada that provide local events, outreach and services to the communities where NEW members and supporters live and work.

Atlanta
Carolinas
Chicago
Cincinnati
Denver
Florida
Greater Philadelphia
Idaho
Mid-Atlantic
Nashville
New England
New York Metro
North Texas
Northern California
Northwest Arkansas
Pacific Northwest
Phoenix
Southern California
South Texas
Toronto
Twin Cities
Western Michigan

History 
NEW founders held organizational meetings in Atlanta, New York and elsewhere in 2000-2001, and the Network of Executive Women was incorporated April 1, 2001. Five thousand dollars in seed money was provided by The Minute Maid Company (then CEO Don Knauss was an early Champion; Ahold USA CEO Bill Grize was one of the first retail leaders to lend his support). 

NEW held a kick-off meeting at the FMI Midwinter Executive Conference, January 22, 2001, and NEW's first official meeting was held April 2, 2001 in New York City. On June 1, 2001, NEW held its second official meeting and elected its first Board and Officer slate.

References

External links 
 Network of Executive Women

Business organizations based in the United States
Women's political advocacy groups in the United States
Gender equality